Pinglish may refer to:

Hybrid forms of English and other languages
Farsi (Persian) text witch is written in English characters
Pakistani English
Palestine English
Papuan Pidgin English
Fingilish or Pingilish, Persian English

Other uses
 Pinglish, a village in Tral, Jammu and Kashmir, India

See also
Poglish or Ponglisch (German), Polish English